Mouhamadou "Mamadou" Kane (born October 12, 2003) is a soccer player who plays for Canadian Premier League club Vancouver FC. Born in Senegal, he has represented Canada at youth level.

Early life 
Kane was born in Mbacké, Senegal and moved to Montréal, Canada at age nine. He began playing youth soccer in Canda at age nine with FS Salaberry. He later joined the CF Montreal Academy.

Club career
In December 2021, he signed a two year contract with an option for a third season with York United of the Canadian Premier League. He made his debut on April 7, 2022 against the HFX Wanderers. In July 2022, he was sent on an intra-league loan to FC Edmonton.

In December 2022, Kane moved to fellow CPL side Vancouver FC for the 2023 season.

International career
In 2019, he was named to the Canada U17 team for the 2019 FIFA U-17 World Cup. He made his debut October 26, starting the match against Brazil U17, and appeared in their other two matches as a substitute. In May 2022, he was named to the 60-man provisional roster for the Canada U20 team for the 2022 CONCACAF U-20 Championship.

Career statistics

References

External links
 

2003 births
Living people
Canadian soccer players
Canada men's youth international soccer players
Senegalese footballers
Senegalese emigrants to Canada
Association football forwards
CF Montréal players
York United FC players
FC Edmonton players
Canadian Premier League players
Vancouver FC players